Artifex Pereo was an American rock band from Louisville, Kentucky that formed in 2008. The band released two independent releases before being signed to Tooth & Nail Records. In 2014, the band released their debut studio album entitled Time in Place that charted on two Billboard charts.

Background
Artifex Pereo are from Louisville, Kentucky, and they formed as a band in 2008. The band name originates from the phrase "Qualis artifex pereo", Roman emperor Nero's famous last words. In Latin this translates to "what an artist dies with me", "artifex" meaning artist and "pereo" meaning perishes.

Music
In April 2014, The band signed with Tooth & Nail Records, and later the next month released their debut studio album.

Independent work

The band released their first musical project on July 18, 2009 entitled Am I Invisible EP. The extended play was produced by guitarist Jordan Haynes in his basement.

Their first album came out on July 23, 2011, which was entitled Ailments & Antidotes.<ref name=indietwo>{{cite web|url=http://www.jesusfreakhideout.com/cdreviews/AilmentsandAntidotes.asp|title=Artifex Pereo, "Ailments & Antidotes" Review|author=Jesus Freak Hideout|publisher=Jesus Freak Hideout|accessdate=June 5, 2014}}</ref> The album was produced by Kris Crummett, but were unable to tour the music because they lost founding member and lead vocalist Evan Redmon.

Interim work
The band secured another lead singer, Portland, Oregon native Lucas Worley. Worley moved to Louisville to be with the band allowing them to tour sporadically. The band started work on their second album with Crummett in the production chair during the winter months of 2013. This album work eventually got picked up by Tooth & Nail Records, which they signed to and led to the creation of their debut studio album.

Studio albums
On May 27, 2014, Artifex Pereo released their debut studio album entitled Time in Place with Tooth & Nail Records. It charted on two Billboard charts, and those were the Christian Albums at No. 26 and No. 17 on the Heatseekers Albums. When the band were signed to Tooth & Nail Records in early April 2014, they released their first single "Hands of Penance". About a month later, the second single from the album was released "Apeiron". However, both of these lead single failed to chart on any sales or airplay Billboard'' charts.

Members 

 Eugene Barker (2008–2017) – bass guitar
 Jeremiah Brinkworth (2008–2017) – keys
 Jamie Davis (2008–2017) – guitar, vocals
 Jordan Haynes (2008–2017) – guitar
 Cory Eaves (2008–2017) – drums
 Evan Redmon (2008–2012) – vocals
 Lucas Worley (2013–present) – lead vocals

Discography

Studio albums

References

External links
 
 

Tooth & Nail Records artists
Musical groups established in 2009
Musical groups disestablished in 2017
Musical groups from Louisville, Kentucky
2009 establishments in Kentucky
2017 disestablishments in Kentucky
Rock music groups from Kentucky